Eleanor Rigby is a statue in Stanley Street, Liverpool, England, designed and made by the entertainer Tommy Steele. It is based on the subject of the Beatles' 1966 song "Eleanor Rigby", which is credited to the Lennon–McCartney partnership.

History
When Tommy Steele was performing in a show in Liverpool in 1981, he made an offer to Liverpool City Council to create a sculpture as a tribute to the Beatles. His fee for the commission would be three pence (half a sixpence). The offer was accepted by the Council, as the statue would be expected to increase the tourist trade of the city, and they made a donation of £4,000 towards its cost. The project was otherwise funded by the Liverpool Echo.

The statue took nine months to make. Steele unveiled it in Liverpool on 3 December 1982.

Description
The statue consists of a bronze figure on a stone bench. The figure is 128 cm high, 120 cm wide, and 96 cm deep. It depicts a seated woman with a handbag on her lap, a shopping bag on her right, and a copy of the Liverpool Echo on her left. Poking from the shopping bag is a milk bottle, and on the newspaper is a sparrow and a piece of bread. The woman is looking down at the sparrow.

Steele included what he described as "magical properties" in his design, all hidden inside the bronze figure and representing a different facet of life. These were: a four-leaf clover (for good luck), a page from the Bible (for spiritual guidance), football boots (representing sport and fun), a comic book (for comedy and adventure), and a sonnet (for love).

On the wall behind the figure is an inscribed plaque which originally read:

 

This inscription has since been replaced.

Notes and references
Notes

Citations

Outdoor sculptures in England
Monuments and memorials to the Beatles
Statues in England
Sculptures of women
Bronze sculptures in the United Kingdom
Monuments and memorials in Liverpool
Buildings and structures in Liverpool
Statues of fictional characters
Musical sculptures
Sculptures of birds